is a Japanese Manga artist. She is the author and illustrator for the manga series Hitohira, the first of her works to be adapted into an anime television series.

Works
Chocolate: maid cafe "curio"Fw: Zombienes ReginaHitohiraI Had That Same Dream AgainKokonoka no MajoMabinogiShirayuki Panimix!Gun-jou''

References

External links
Izumi Kirihara's personal website 

Year of birth missing (living people)
Living people
Manga artists